Runrunes is a news, opinion and analysis website dedicated to Venezuelan topics. The website was founded by Venezuelan investigative journalist Nelson Bocaranda.

History
Bocaranda has worked for several Venezuelan media organizations since his introduction into journalism. He originally had a radio show with Unión Radio titled Los Runrunes de Nelson and a column with El Universal known as Runrunes. In 2010, Bocaranda found the website Runrunes, carrying on the similar name of his other works.

Demographics
Runrunes' main visitors are from Venezuela, the United States and Spain.

Censorship and attacks

Runrunes has had multiple controversies with the Venezuelan government. Diosdado Cabello, a high-ranking Venezuelan official, intimidated a journalist of the website on his television program, criticizing their work. In January 2016, Bocaranda was detained for nearly 2 hours at Maiquetia International Airport while authorities checked his phone. On 6 May 2016, Bocaranda's Twitter account was hacked with the hacker attempting to discredit the journalist.

Runrunes servers were disrupted from cyberattacks coming from Russia on 28 May 2019.

Access to Runrunes was disrupted by CANTV, the state internet provider on 17 May 2020.

References

External links
Runrunes - Facebook
Runrunes - Twitter
Runrunes - YouTube Channel

Venezuelan news websites
Spanish-language websites
Media of the Crisis in Venezuela